Sean Aidan Raggett (born  25 January 1994) is a professional footballer who plays as a centre-back for League One club Portsmouth.

Career

Dover Athletic
Raggett, a product of Gillingham's academy, joined Dover Athletic at 16, where he would go on to make over 150 appearances. In October 2010, he joined Sittingbourne on a dual registration basis. He made his debut for the club as a substitute in a 1–0 defeat at Fleet Town on 30 October 2010. with his full debut coming in the following Saturday's 2–1 home defeat to Leatherhead where he "played well above the standard you would expect from a 16 year old". He made a total of seven starts and one substitute appearance for the club, with his final game coming in their last game of the season, a 2–2 draw at home to Godalming Town. In 2013 he had a loan spell at Isthmian League Division One South side Whitstable Town. It was at Dover, under the guidance of manager Chris Kinnear, that he learned his trade and as well as becoming a talented and uncompromising centre back, began to score trademark headed goals.

Lincoln City
A crowd favourite, his departure to Lincoln City in 2016 was a big loss to Dover but ultimately led to his big break. On the 18 February 2017 Raggett scored an 89th-minute winner in an FA Cup 5th round match against Premier League side Burnley taking Lincoln to The Competition’s Quarter Finals, becoming the first non-league team to reach that stage in 103 years.

Norwich City
On 18 August 2017, Raggett joined Norwich City on a three-year deal for an undisclosed fee. As part of the deal, Raggett rejoined Lincoln City on loan until 1 January 2018. During the following preseason Norwich travelled to Lincoln City, a game in which Raggett, now back at Norwich, scored an “embarrassing own goal”, giving the Imps a consolation goal in a 3-1 win for Norwich.

Rotherham United (loan)
On 25 July 2018, Raggett joined Rotherham United on a season-long loan deal with an option for Norwich to recall him in January. Although he stayed beyond January, the loan was ended prematurely due to Raggett requiring surgery for an ankle injury. He returned to Norwich in early March 2019.

Portsmouth (loan)
On 27 June 2019, Raggett joined Portsmouth on a season-long loan deal.

Portsmouth
On 3 August 2020, Raggett joined Portsmouth permanently, on a two-year deal after being released by Norwich. Raggett signed a new two-year deal at the end of a 2021–22 season that saw him win the Supporters' Player of the Season Award.

International career
Raggett was born in England to an Irish father from Cork. Raggett has declared his intention to represent the Republic of Ireland national football team internationally in the future. While playing semi-pro football at Dover, Sean Raggett was called up to the England national C team ahead of a friendly with Republic of Ireland under-21s on 1 June 2015.

Career statistics

Honours
Lincoln City
National League: 2016–17

Portsmouth
EFL Trophy runner-up: 2019–20
Individual

 Portsmouth Player of the Season: 2021–22

References

External links

Living people
1993 births
People from Gillingham, Kent
Footballers from Kent
English footballers
England semi-pro international footballers
English people of Irish descent
Association football defenders
Dover Athletic F.C. players
Gillingham F.C. players
Sittingbourne F.C. players
Herne Bay F.C. players
Whitstable Town F.C. players
Lincoln City F.C. players
Rotherham United F.C. players
Portsmouth F.C. players
National League (English football) players
English Football League players